The Tale of Theodor the Archer is a 2008 Russian animated film directed by Ludmila Steblyanko.

Cast 

 Sergey Bezrukov (Rick Astley) — Theodor
 Chulpan Khamatova (Mandy Moore) — Marcy
 Viktor Sukhorukov (David Andrews) — King of Russia
 Dmitri Dyuzhev (Arnold Schwarzenegger) — Colonel
 Konstantin Bronzit (Ryan Adams) — Tweedele Dum / Tuoddale Dee
 Mikhail Chernyak — English ambassador (Samuel E. Wright as Mexican ambassador)
 Aleksandr Revva (Robin Williams) — Witche
 Yevgenia Dobrovolskaya (Donna Murphy) — Princess's nanny
 Mikhail Yefremov (Carlos Alazraqui) — A disembodied voice (aka "Something-That-Can't-Be")
 Irina Bezrukova (Mindy Kaling) — Princess
 Sergey Glezin — Wild ambassador sounds
 Oleg Kulikovich (Jim Cummings) — Narrator

Reception
It was nominated for the Asia Pacific Screen Award for Best Animated Feature Film at the 3rd Asia Pacific Screen Awards.

References

External links
 

2008 films
Russian children's fantasy films
Russian animated films
2008 animated films
Flash animated films
Melnitsa Animation Studio animated films
Films based on fairy tales